Carlos Vicens (born 12 February 1983) is a Spanish football manager and former player who is currently Josep Guardiola's assistant at Manchester City.

Career 
An amateur player who retired early to focus on management, Vicens moved his first steps as a coach in his native island of Mallorca for minor clubs such as Ses Salines and Santanyí; he successively took on as assistant to Nico López at Llosetense.

In July 2017 he moved to England to join Manchester City as a youth coach, working as an assistant to the Under-12 and Under-13 teams in his first season, and then being promoted as an assistant to the Under-18 team the following year; he was hired by the club after having sent a CV to them back in 2016.

In August 2020 he was promoted as Under-18 main coach, replacing his previous boss Gareth Taylor. On his first season in charge, he guided Manchester City Under-18 to win the FA Youth Cup.

In July 2021, Vicens was promoted as Josep Guardiola's assistant in charge of the first team at Manchester City.

On 6 May 2022, Eredivisie outfit Heracles Almelo announced Vicens will be in charge of the first team effective from 1 July 2022, after having signed a two-year contract. However, in June 2022, a few days after Heracles Almelo were relegated for the first time in 17 years, Vicens mutually parted ways with the Dutch club, choosing to stay on at Manchester City instead.

References 

1983 births
Living people
Spanish football managers